Villademor de la Vega is a municipality located in the province of León, Castile and León, Spain. According to the 2013 census (INE), the municipality has a population of 390 inhabitants.

References

External links 
 Ayuntamiento de Villademor de la Vega

Municipalities in the Province of León